Vitekorchis excavata, also known as the hollow oncidium, is a species of orchid native to the Neotropics.

Taxonomy 
Synonyms include Oncidium aurosum, Oncidium boissieri, Oncidium excavatum var. dawsonii, Oncidium rupestre, Oncidium skinneri, and Oncidium excavatum.

Description 
The flowers, sepals and petals are yellow, spotted with brown.

Distribution and habitat 
Vitekorchis excavata is found naturally in Brazil, Peru, Colombia and Ecuador and grows on steep embankments in moist montane forest at elevations of 2400–2800 meters.

References 

excavata
Orchids of Central America
Orchids of Brazil
Orchids of Colombia
Orchids of Ecuador
Orchids of Peru
Plants described in 1838